Andreas Walzer (born 20 May 1970) is a German cyclist. He won the gold medal in the Men's team pursuit at the 1992 Summer Olympics along with Jens Lehmann, Stefan Steinweg, Guido Fulst and Michael Glöckner.

References 

1970 births
Living people
Cyclists at the 1992 Summer Olympics
Olympic cyclists of Germany
Olympic gold medalists for Germany
German male cyclists
Olympic medalists in cycling
People from Homburg, Saarland
Cyclists from Saarland
Medalists at the 1992 Summer Olympics
German track cyclists
20th-century German people